Ronan Dwane (born 1973) is an Irish retired hurler who played as a centre-forward for the Cork senior team.

Born in Aghada, County Cork, Dwane first played competitive hurling during his schooling at Midleton CBS Secondary School. He arrived on the inter-county scene at the age of sixteen when he first linked up with the Cork minor team before later joining the under-21 and intermediate sides. He joined the senior panel during the 1997 championship.

At club level Dwane was a two-time championship medallist with Imokilly He also played with Aghada.

In retirement from playing Dwane has become involved in team management and coaching. As well as coaching Midleton CBS at various levels he has coached the Carrigtwohill senior team. At inter-county level he has served as coach with various Cork teams in all grades. He is the current manager of the Cork intermediate team.

Honours

Player

Midleton CBS
Dean Ryan Cup (1): 1989

Aghada
Cork Minor B Hurling Championship (1): 1989

Imokilly
Cork Senior Hurling Championship (2): 1997, 1998

Cork
All-Ireland Intermediate Hurling Championship (1): 1997
Munster Intermediate Hurling Championship (2): 1997, 2001

References

1973 births
Living people
Aghada hurlers
Imokilly hurlers
Cork inter-county hurlers
Hurling managers